Looking for the Light is the third studio album by Hispanic-American country music artist Rick Trevino, released on February 7, 1995. Although its second single "Bobbie Ann Mason" was a Top Ten hit on the Hot Country Singles & Tracks (now Hot Country Songs) charts in 1995, neither of the album's other singles — "Save This One for Me" or the title track — reached Top 40.

The album was also released in Spanish under the title Un Rayo de Luz ("A Ray of Light"), with Spanish-language versions of most of the songs on Looking for the Light. This version charted at #22 on the Top Latin Albums charts.

Critical reception
Entertainment Weekly gave the album a B, saying that Trevino "mixes cliche-ridden heartbreak songs with muscular two-step" and citing "Poor, Broke, Mixed-Up Mess of a Heart" and "Save This One for Me" as standouts. Chris Dickinson gave a three-star review in New Country magazine, comparing Trevino's voice to George Strait's and citing the title track as a "truly vulnerable" performance, although he thought that Trevino sounded too young and forced on "Save This One for Me" and "Bobbie Ann Mason".

Track listing

Track listing (Un Rayo de Luz)

"Perdí la Partida"
"Un Rayo de Luz"
bilingual version
"Tú Para Mi"
"Eso Me Dijo"
"Corazón Soñador"
"Me la Guardan Para Mi"
"Alivia el Dolor"
"Tu Eres Mi Verdad"
"Ella No Podrá Decir Que No Me Vió Llorar"
"Un Rayo de Luz"

Personnel
Tracks 1, 3, 4, 6 - 9, 11
Eddie Bayers - drums
Mark Casstevens - acoustic guitar
Sonny Garrish - steel guitar
Rob Hajacos - fiddle
Joey Miskulin - accordion on "I Want a Girl in a Pick-Up Truck"
Michael Rhodes - bass guitar
Hargus "Pig" Robbins - piano (Tracks 4 & 11)
Matt Rollings - piano
Brent Rowan - electric guitar
John Wesley Ryles - background vocals
Rick Trevino - lead vocals
Dennis Wilson - background vocals

Tracks 2, 5, 10
Paul Franklin - steel guitar
John Jorgenson - electric guitar
Larry Marrs - bass guitar
Tim Mensy - background vocals on "Looking for the Light"
Steve Nathan - piano
John Wesley Ryles - background vocals
Blaine Sprouse - fiddle
Rick Trevino - lead vocals
Steve Turner - drums
John Willis - acoustic guitar
Dennis Wilson - background vocals

Charts

Weekly charts

Year-end charts

References

1995 albums
Columbia Records albums
Rick Trevino albums
Albums produced by Blake Chancey
Albums produced by Steve Buckingham (record producer)